Gebi may be:
Gebe language or Minyaifuin, an Austronesian language of eastern Indonesia, spoken on the islands between Halmahera and Waigeo
Maria language (Papua New Guinea), a Manubaran language spoken in the "bird's tail" of Papua New Guinea

See also 
 Ghebi dialect, a dialect of Hindko spoken in Pakistan